John Howard Churchill (9 June 1920 – 29 April 1990) was Dean of Carlisle from 1973 to 1987.

Born in 1920, he was educated at Sutton Valence School  and Trinity College, Cambridge and  ordained in 1944. He held curacies at St George, Camberwell and All Hallows, Tottenham before becoming Chaplain of King's College London and a lecturer in Theology. In 1960 he became Vicar of St George, Sheffield and in 1973 a Canon Residentiary of St Edmundsbury Cathedral, his last post before the deanery.  An eminent author, he died in 1990.

References

1920 births
1990 deaths
People educated at Sutton Valence School
Alumni of Trinity College, Cambridge
Deans of Carlisle
Chaplains of King's College London
1979 deaths